IV Corps was a corps-sized formation of the United States Army that saw service in both World War I and World War II.

World War I
The corps was first organized on 20 June 1918, during World War I as part of the American Expeditionary Forces. Under Major General Charles H. Muir serving on the Western Front, as Headquarters IV Army Corps. It participated in the offensives of St. Mihiel and Lorraine, being demobilized in Weimar Republic, 11 May 1919.

World War II
Formerly reactivated without interruptions since October 1939, during World War II, the IV Corps was reconstituted on 27 June 1944, replacing the VI Corps in the U.S. Fifth Army's order of battle in the Italian campaign, after Allied forces liberated the Italian capital of Rome in the summer of 1944 when VI Corps was withdrawn to take part in Operation Dragoon, the Allied invasion of southern France. Initially the corps had two divisions—the U.S. 1st and South African 6th Armoured Divisions—but was reinforced with the U.S. 92nd Infantry Division from August, the 1st Brazilian Infantry Division from September, and the U.S. 10th Mountain Division in February 1945, as well as the U.S. 85th Infantry Division in April.

Under command of Major General Willis D. Crittenberger, the IV Corps took part in the fighting through the summer of 1944 as the Fifth Army, under the command of Lieutenant General Mark W. Clark, and the British Eighth Army, commanded by Lieutenant General Sir Oliver W. H. Leese, advanced north to the River Arno. In the autumn and winter of 1944 the IV Corps formed the central wing of the Fifth Army's sector, taking the major role in the Fifth Army's assault on the Gothic Line in the central Apennine Mountains, fighting to break through to the Lombardy plains beyond.

Inactivation
In the spring of 1945 the corps, still in the Fifth Army's central sector, took part in the successful Italian spring offensive, breaking out of the Apennines to outflank the units of the German Tenth and Fourteenth Armies defending Bologna and forming a pincer with the British Eighth Army on the right to surround them, and then driving on to the River Po and finally Verona and Brescia.

The corps was inactivated on 13 October 1945, at Camp Kilmer, New Jersey, it was reactivated again at Birmingham, Alabama, in 1958 and inactivated at Birmingham in 1968.

Bibliography
Clark, Mark Wayne. Calculated Risk. New York: Enigma Books, 1950, republished 2007. 
Moraes, Mascarenhas de, The Brazilian Expeditionary Force, By Its Commander US Government Printing Office, 1966. ASIN B000PIBXCG
Crittenberger, Willis D., "The final campaign across Italy"; (1st Print 1952)  (of 1997 printing  )
Wilson, John B. "Armies, Corps, Divisions, and Separate Brigades | Army Lineage Series" U.S. Government Printing Office, 1999. CMH Pub 60-7-1.

Notes

04
04
Military units and formations established in 1918
Military units and formations disestablished in 1968